Cass Township is one of fifteen townships in Greene County, Indiana, USA.  As of the 2010 census, its population was 358.

Geography
The streams of Doans Creek, Gilbert Creek, Mud Creek and Woodhouse Branch run through this township.

Cities and towns
 Newberry

Adjacent townships
 Taylor Township (east)
 Madison Township, Daviess County (southeast)
 Elmore Township, Daviess County (southwest)
 Vigo Township, Knox County (west)
 Washington Township (northwest)

Cemeteries
The township contains three cemeteries: Gilbreath, Old Slinkard and Slinkard.

Major highways
 Indiana State Road 57

References
 
 United States Census Bureau cartographic boundary files

External links
 Indiana Township Association
 United Township Association of Indiana

Townships in Greene County, Indiana
Bloomington metropolitan area, Indiana
Townships in Indiana